Konetampet is a village in Tiruvallur District of the Indian state of Tamil Nadu. It is known for its rich and fertile agricultural lands and is blessed with the flowing of river, from west to east, named 'Kusasthalai' . It has produced many personalities who have made a mark in film industry, medical profession, Information Technology, Entrepreneurship, Trading and politics.

Geography

Transportation

The nearest railway station is at Ekambarakuppam. The nearest airport is Tirupati.

References

Villages in Tiruvallur district konetamma petta